Geoffrey Pike may refer to:

Geoff Pike, English footballer
Geoff Pike (author), Australian author, also writing as Pai Kit Fai
Benny Pike (Geoffrey Benjamin Pike), Australian boxer at the 1980 Summer Olympics

See also
Geoffrey Pyke (1893–1948), English journalist, spy and inventor